XHORF-FM is a radio station on 99.7 FM in Los Mochis, Sinaloa. It is owned by Grupo Radio Centro and carries its Planeta pop format.

History
XEORF-AM 950 received its concession on December 12, 1969. The 4,000-watt station has always broadcast from the El Fuerte/Mochicahui area, and for the first 15 years of its existence, it was the main radio station for El Fuerte, Choix and the surrounding areas. In 1985, the del Bosque family relocated XEORF's studios to Los Mochis, leaving the town without a local radio station until XHPFRT-FM signed on in January 2019.

In 2011, XEORF moved to FM as XHORF-FM 99.7.

In May 2016, Grupo Radio México exited Los Mochis and transferred control of its stations to Radiorama. As a result, all its stations picked up Radiorama formats, with XHORF adopting the @FM format instead of GRM's similar Planeta format. At this time, the XHORF facility was relocated from Mochicahui into Los Mochis. XHORF returned to Planeta when GRC resumed operating the cluster in February 2019.

References

Radio stations in Sinaloa